The Denton County Times is a newspaper that covers Denton County, Texas and parts of Collin County, Texas, United States.

The newspaper is a free online newspaper that covers neighborhoods, schools, events, etc. The Denton County Times is run on its website and publishes new issues every two weeks.

Interviews with the unnamed executives (for security purposes) state that the newspaper gets its information from the actual scenes of whatever the article is about (such as fires, new reforms, etc.). Stories are mainly written about Little Elm, Aubrey, Frisco and Anna (which is on the outskirts of Collin County).

The Times also does Pee-Wee sports stories, such as football, baseball, basketball, etc. SAFAC (Stray Animal Finders and Caretakers), a local stray animal support agency, only gives its updates and stories to the Times. The Times has no definite Editor-in-Chief but does have strong leadership. However, the Times does also local churches on the 380, such as COC Metro.  The Times doesn't have an actual spiritual section but it does like to cover churches closely. Upward Soccer is another Pee-Wee sport that the Times does cover often.  The Times is non-profit but does advertise somewhat for sponsors of the newspaper.

The Times provides print copies, but only in certain neighborhoods.  The Times does have special dates on some issues, such as Funny Clown Day in June. The Times encourages kids to post their articles that they wrote on the forum, and some are even published.

External links 
 

Newspapers published in the Dallas–Fort Worth metroplex